Shin Han-cheol (born 23 March 1970) is a South Korean former professional tennis player.

In the early 1990s, Shin competed in professional tournaments across Asia and reached a best singles ranking of 273 in the world. His most notable performances on the ATP Tour came at the Seoul Open, where he twice won through to the second round. He played in the qualifying draw for the 1993 Australian Open.

Shin was a member of the South Korea Davis Cup team between 1992 and 1994 and appeared in the total of five ties. This included World Group play-offs against CIS in 1992 and Spain in 1993.

A singles gold medalist at the 1993 World Student Games in Buffalo, Shin also represented South Korea at the 1994 Asian Games and made the singles quarterfinals.

See also
List of South Korea Davis Cup team representatives

References

External links
 
 
 

1970 births
Living people
South Korean male tennis players
Universiade gold medalists for South Korea
Universiade medalists in tennis
Tennis players at the 1994 Asian Games
Asian Games competitors for South Korea